Camp Kinser is a United States Marine Corps logistics base in Okinawa, Japan.

Overview

Camp Kinser is a major logistics base for Marine Corps Forces on Okinawa. Its flagship command is the 3rd Marine Logistics Group. It sits adjacent to the East China Sea in the city of Urasoe, and just a few kilometers north of Naha.

Camp Kinser is the southernmost of nine Marine Corps bases on Okinawa, which make up Marine Corps Base Camp Smedley D. Butler. Another military installation, the Naha Port Facility which belongs to the U.S. Army is located south of Camp Kinser.

Camp Kinser is equipped with a DeCA Commissary, AAFES Shopette, and an AAFES PX, which houses a food court with eateries such as Subway, Pizza Hut, and Taco Bell. It sports a bowling alley, enlisted club, fitness center, and mess hall.

It was named for 21 year old Sergeant Elbert L. Kinser, who threw himself on a grenade to protect his fellow Marines at the Battle of Okinawa during World War II, and was posthumously awarded the Medal of Honor.

History
As of 2013, the U.S has indicated that it wants to return Camp Kinser also known as the Machinato or Makiminato Service Area to Japan by 2030.

Environmental pollution
In 1975, a large leak of hexavalent chromium spilled at the base with contamination reportedly 8000 times safe levels. The U.S. consulate in Naha dismissed the accident as a “flap” and warned “the newspapers and the leftists will certainly make good use of this issue against us.” In 1993, the US government issued a classified report entitled "USFJ Talking Paper on Possible Toxic Contamination at Camp Kinser, Okinawa". Publicly available U.S. military documents have quoted excerpts suggesting extensive pollution with Vietnam era chemicals stored there, like insecticides including DDT (dichlorodiphenyltrichloroethane) and heavy metals, rodenticides, herbicides, inorganic and organic acids, alkalis, inorganic salts, organic solvents like vapor degreasers and ferric chloride, of which 12.5 tons were buried.

Evidence of wildlife contamination are the 2013 finding of mongooses caught near the installation with high levels of polychlorinated biphenyls and the September 2015 report of habu snakes from the vicinity of Camp Kinser with elevated concentrations of polychlorinated biphenyls and DDT. In 2009 six Japanese workers of a warehouse on the base had fallen ill of an unknown illness. A scholar from Okinawa International University has speculated that "the Pentagon wants to conceal the reality of contamination that would damage the political value of [Camp Kinser]'s return".

Resident Commands

3rd Maintenance Battalion
3rd Marine Logistics Group
3rd Supply Battalion
Combat Logistics Regiment 35
Combat Logistics Regiment 37

See also
Naval Base Okinawa

References

External links

 U.S. Marines in Japan official site
 Okinawa: The Last Battle. US Army official site

United States Armed Forces in Okinawa Prefecture
United States Marine Corps bases
Installations of the U.S. Department of Defense in Japan